Oxacis is a genus of false blister beetles in the family Oedemeridae. There are at least 30 described species in Oxacis.

Species
These 30 species belong to the genus Oxacis:

References

Further reading

External links

 

Oedemeridae
Tenebrionoidea genera
Taxa named by John Lawrence LeConte